Cantonese music may refer to:

The music of Cantonese-speaking peoples, especially:
Music of Guangdong
Music of Hong Kong
Music of Macau
Cantonese language music, especially Cantopop
A style of traditional instrumental music known as Guangdong music